John Allen (born 14 November 1964) is a Welsh-Finnish football player and coach. He is the head coach of the Under-19 squad of Finnish club TPS.

Playing career 
Allen started playing football at his local club Chester City. After a brief visit at Mansfield Town, he emigrated to Finland. At MP he made his top flight debut in 1987. He made a total of 282 appearances and scored 50 goals while playing for RoPS, TPS, MYPA and TPV. As a player, he won the Finnish Championship, then known as Mestaruussarja, twice.

Managerial career 
After retiring as a player he joined his former club, TPS, as an assistant coach in 2003. He took charge of the first team as a caretaker in 2008 after Martti Kuusela's dismissal. After the appointment of Pasi Rautiainen in 2009, Allen became the manager of TPS's feeder club, ÅIFK as well as the youth teams of TPS.

In November 2009 Allen signed a two-year contract with RoPS, then playing in the second highest division of Finnish football system. After only one season with RoPS they gained promotion to Veikkausliiga after being crowned the champions of Ykkönen.

In October 2014 he was signed by FC Jazz.

Allen joined Swedish team Oskarshamns AIK in December 2018, where he lasted as headcoach until April 2020. In May 2020, he returned to TPS as an assistant coach of the club's women's team.

Honours
Ykkönen: 2010

References

1964 births
Living people
English football managers
Turun Palloseura footballers
Rovaniemen Palloseura managers
Myllykosken Pallo −47 players
Kuopion Palloseura players
Sportspeople from Chester
Expatriate footballers in Finland
English footballers
Chester City F.C. players
Mansfield Town F.C. players
English expatriate footballers
TPS Turku football managers
Expatriate footballers in Sweden
Malmö FF players
FC Jazz managers
Association football midfielders
English expatriate sportspeople in Finland
English expatriate sportspeople in Sweden
FC Inter Turku managers
Salon Palloilijat players
Salon Palloilijat managers
Veikkausliiga players
Allsvenskan players
Tampereen Pallo-Veikot players